Jánský Vrch is a castle located in the Jeseník District in the Olomouc Region of the Czech Republic. The castle stands on a hill above the town of Javorník in the north-western edge of Czech Silesia, in area what was a part of the Duchy of Nysa. For most of its history the castle belonged to the Prince-bishops of Breslau (Wrocław) in Silesia.

History
The castle is first mentioned in written sources in 1307, when it was still the property of the Princes of Świdnica. In 1348, Bolko II of Świdnica sold it to the Prince-bishop Preczlaus of Pogarell (1341–1376), and since that time, the castle belonged to Breslau bishops.

During the 15th century, the castle was considerably damaged by the Hussites and therefore large-scale repairs were needed. The rebuilding of the castle took place under the rule of Bishop Jan IV Roth, at the end of the 15th century, and it was completed in 1509 by his successor – Prince-bishop John V Thurzó (1506–1520). At that time, the castle was also renamed as Johannesberg ("John's Hill"), to honor the patron of the Bishops of Breslau, John the Baptist.

The original fortified castle was later rebuilt in the Baroque style under the rule of Philipp Gotthard von Schaffgotsch (1716–1795), who made it his primary residence. During this time, Johannesberg castle and the town Javorník also became the cultural center of Upper Silesia. Among the most famous personalities living there, was August Carl Ditters von Dittersdorf, renowned Viennese composer and violinist.

Following the death of Prince-Bishop Philipp Gotthard von Schaffgotsch, the castle was once again rebuilt as a summer residence by Bishop Joseph Christian Reichsfürst von Hohenlohe-Waldenburg-Bartenstein. It remained an important centre of cultural life in the region until the beginning of the 20th century.

In 1959, the castle Jánský Vrch was loaned to the State and recovered by the Czechoslovak government in 1984, following a property agreement between the Polish and Czechoslovak Catholic archdioceses. It is now under the administration of the National Monument Institute in Olomouc and since 1 January 2002, it is on the list of Czech national cultural monuments.

Gallery

References
 Gernot, Ludwig and Wolf, Kurt. Jauernig und das Jauerniger Ländchen. Das 2. Heimatbuch des ehemaligen Gerichtsbezirkes Jauernig, 1995.
 Hosák, Ladislav. Historický místopis Moravy a Slezska v letech 1848–1960, 1967, Profil Ostrava.
 Kuča, Karel. Města a městečka v Čechách, na Moravě a ve Slezsku II. díl, 1997, Libri Praha.
 Pachl, Hans. Jauernig und das Jauerniger Ländchen. Ein Heimatbuch des ehemaligen Gerichtsbezirks Jauernig, 1983.

External links

 Official web-site

Jeseník District
Castles in the Olomouc Region
Museums in the Olomouc Region
Historic house museums in the Czech Republic
National Cultural Monuments of the Czech Republic